Beyond the Bridge is a German progressive metal and progressive rock band, formed as Fall Out in Frankfurt, in 1999.

Background 
The band was formed as Fall Out in Frankfurt am Main in Germany as a school band by guitar player Peter Degenfeld-Schonburg and bass player Dominik Stotzem. In 2008 and after several breaks the band started to experiment for a concept studio album and has been renamed to 'Beyond the Bridge'. In 2012 the band released its first album 'The Old Man and the Spirit' with producer Simon Oberender and Frontiers Records.  Shortly after release of the album, producer and main contributor to the album's release Simon Oberender, suddenly died.

Band members 
 Dilenya Mar - vocals
 Herbie Langhans - vocals
 Peter Degenfeld - guitar 
 Christopher Tarnow - keyboards
 Dominik Stotzem - bass
 Fabian Maier - drums

Discography 
 The Old Man and the Spirit (album, 2012, Frontiers Records)

References

External links 
 http://www.beyondthebridge.net/

Dark rock groups
German heavy metal musical groups
German rock music groups
Alternative metal musical groups
German pop music groups
German gothic rock groups
Frontiers Records artists